Noah Awuku (born 9 January 2000) is a German professional footballer who plays as a forward for  club Holstein Kiel.

Club career
Awuku made his professional debut for Holstein Kiel in the 2. Bundesliga on 20 October 2018, coming on as a substitute in the 89th minute for Masaya Okugawa in the 1–1 home draw against 1. FC Köln.

On 2 September 2019, Chemnitzer FC announced the signing of Awuku on a season-long deal.

References

External links
 
 

2000 births
Living people
Sportspeople from Kiel
Footballers from Schleswig-Holstein
German footballers
Germany youth international footballers
Ghanaian footballers
German sportspeople of Ghanaian descent
Association football forwards
Holstein Kiel players
Holstein Kiel II players
Chemnitzer FC players
2. Bundesliga players
Regionalliga players